The 2021 Georgia Bulldogs baseball team represents the University of Georgia during the 2021 NCAA Division I baseball season. The Bulldogs play their home games at Foley Field as a member of the Southeastern Conference They are led by head coach Scott Stricklin, in his eight year as head coach.

Previous season

The 2020 Georgia Bulldogs baseball team notched a 14–4 (0–0) regular-season record. The season prematurely ended on March 12, 2020, due to concerns over the COVID-19 pandemic.

Personnel

Roster

Coaching Staff

Game log

Rankings

Record vs. conference opponents

2021 MLB draft

References

Georgia
Georgia Bulldogs baseball seasons
Georgia Bulldogs baseball